Barrington Preservation Society is a museum and preservation society in Barrington, Rhode Island.

The BPS was founded in 1885 as the “Barrington Historic Antiquarian Society” and renamed the “Barrington Preservation Society”  in 1965. The society is dedicated to telling the history of the Town of Barrington, Rhode Island through its museum and events.

References

External links
Official website

Museums in Bristol County, Rhode Island
History museums in Rhode Island
Buildings and structures in Barrington, Rhode Island